Ambrai Ghat or Manjhi Ghat and Hanuman Ghat is a main ghat situated near the waterfront of Lake Pichola in Udaipur. It is situated opposite to the Gangaur Ghat, near the Jagdish Chowk area. Ambrai Ghat is a gateway to a delighting experience that passes from the old streets of the area called as ‘Old City’ in Udaipur. The Ambrai Ghat has been maintained well by the Nagar Parishad of Udaipur, marble boundaries are installed and wide seats for resting are available on the Ghat.

Overview
Ambrai Ghat is a popular for its lake-side location surrounded by many popular hotels including the Ambrai restaurant. It is also popular for the picturesque view of City Palace, Udaipur, and surrounding lakes.

See also
 Udaipur
 Tourist Attractions in Udaipur
 Lake Pichola
 City Palace, Udaipur
 Gangaur Ghat

References

Tourist attractions in Udaipur
Ghats of India